Patrick Grant (born 1963) is a Detroit-born American composer living and working in New York City. His works are a synthesis of classical, popular, and world musical styles that have found place in concert halls, film, theater, dance, and visual media over three continents. Over the last three decades, his music has moved from post-punk and classically bent post-minimal styles, through Balinese-inspired gamelan and microtonality, to ambient, electronic soundscapes involving many layers of acoustic and electronically amplified instruments. Throughout its evolution, his music has consistently contained a "...a driving and rather harsh energy redolent of rock, as well as a clean sense of melodicism...intricate cross-rhythms rarely let up..." Known as a producer and co-producer of live musical events, he has presented many concerts of his own and other composers, including a 2013 Guinness World Record-breaking performance of 175 electronic keyboards in NYC. He is the creator of International Strange Music Day (August 24) and the pioneer of the electric guitar procession Tilted Axes.

References

External links 
 
 
 Patrick Grant on Vimeo
 Patrick Grant on The MMiXdown
 
 Tilted Axes 2011 Documentary on Guitarkadia
 Scenes from Tilted Axes 2012 on Guitarkadia
 (Photo Essay) Tilted Axes Detroit: a Midtown street procession of two dozen mobile electric guitars

American male classical composers
American classical composers
Postmodern composers
Musicians from Detroit
1963 births
Living people
Date of birth missing (living people)
Classical musicians from Michigan